Aegypius prepyrenaicus is an extinct Old World vulture which existed in what is now Spain  during the Middle Pleistocene period. An ulna possibly referable to this species has been found in Gibraltar. It was described in 2001 by Hernandez Carrasquilla.

References
A new species of vulture (Aves, Aegypiinae) from the upper Pleistocene of Spain https://www.ardeola.org/uploads/articles/docs/468.pdf

Aegypius
Prehistoric birds of Europe
Fossil taxa described in 2001